was a railway station located in Suzu, Ishikawa Prefecture, Japan. This station was opened on September 21, 1964, and abandoned on April 1, 2005.

Line
 Noto Railway
 Noto Line

Adjacent stations

References

External links 
 Shōin Station page at notor.info

Railway stations in Ishikawa Prefecture
Defunct railway stations in Japan
Stations of West Japan Railway Company
Railway stations in Japan opened in 1964
Railway stations closed in 2005